Cheikh Tidiane Ameth Boye (born 10 August 1961) is a Senegalese middle-distance runner. He competed in the men's 800 metres at the 1988 Summer Olympics.

References

External links
 

1961 births
Living people
Athletes (track and field) at the 1988 Summer Olympics
Senegalese male middle-distance runners
Olympic athletes of Senegal
Place of birth missing (living people)